Greeneville High School (GHS) is a high school in Greeneville, Tennessee, a town most known as the place in which President Andrew Johnson began his political career as the city mayor. It is part of the Town of Greeneville City School System. In 2008, it was named as a Blue Ribbon School, the only high school in Tennessee to receive such honor that year.

Programs of study
GHS offers various academic programs to its students including Advanced Placement (AP) courses. Students taking AP courses may be eligible for college-level credit hours upon receiving a satisfactory score (specific to the college institution) on the Advanced Placement exams.

Students also have the opportunity to earn college-level course credit through GHS' partnership with Walter's State Community College dual enrollment courses or the GEAP program which allows students to graduate high school with both a high school diploma as well as their associate degree.

Feeder schools
 Eastview Elementary (grades PreK–5)
 Hal Henard Elementary (grades PreK–5)
 Highland Year-round Elementary (grades K-5)
 Tusculum View Elementary (grades PreK–5)
 Greeneville Middle (grades 6–8)

Extra-curricular offerings

Athletics
GHS offers many sports teams including: baseball, basketball, football, bowling, cheerleading, cross country, dance team, golf, soccer, softball, swim, tennis, track and field, volleyball, and wrestling. The GHS football team won the Tennessee state football championships (Division 4A) in 2010,2011,2017 and 2018. Greeneville also won the women's soccer state championship in 2015 and 2016. The wrestling team has made 22 dual wrestling state appearances while winning A-AA team state in 2013 and was runner ups in 1995 (large school), 2014, and 2017. The wrestling team has multiple individual state champions (6x) including multiple state champions Daniel Crosby (02-03) and Trent Knight (17-19).

Notable alumni

References

External links 
 

Educational institutions in the United States with year of establishment missing
Greeneville, Tennessee
Public high schools in Tennessee
Schools in Greene County, Tennessee